Roy Painter (born 1933) was a former leading figure on the British far right.

A cab driver, he was a leading member of the Conservatives in Tottenham and had stood as a candidate for them in the Greater London Council. A supporter of Enoch Powell, he was involved with the Conservative Monday Club, although he resigned from the group (and the Tories) in 1972 when the Club began a process of removing its most extreme members. Following his resignation, Painter joined the National Front, rapidly rising to a post on the NF Directorate by 1974.

He made a weak start as a party candidate for the NF in Tottenham at the February 1974 general election; he finished with 1,270 votes (4.1%), behind the National Independence Party candidate. An improvement was shown in the October 1974 election when he captured 2,211 votes (8.3%) in the same seat. It has been argued that the vote was as much a personal one for Painter, a popular businessman in Haringey, as it was an endorsement of the NF.

He became a prominent figure in the 'populist' wing of the NF, opposing John Tyndall and Martin Webster. He wrote an article in a 1974 issue of Spearhead entitled "Let's Make Nationalism Popular" which extolled the virtues of this path. It was followed by a rebuttal from Tyndall who described Painter's arguments as "sheer unadulterated claptrap". Whilst espousing populism, Painter would tell Martin Webster, "I am a national socialist at heart. Only I am careful." The 'populists', however, began to outvote Tyndall on the Directorate and Painter dismissed Tyndall as a "tin pot Führer".

Painter was believed by The Guardian to be a potential rival leader. However, he instead supported John Kingsley Read. Kingsley Read came under bitter attack from the hardliners who regained control of the party in 1976. "Kingsley Read, Roy Painter and other ex-Conservative populists" left to form the short-lived  National Party and Painter was appointed its Directorate.

Painter rejoined the Conservatives in 1978, although his role with them was confined to local politics.

Painter continues to be involved on the fringe of the far right. In 2003, with Ian Anderson, he addressed a conference organised by the Conservative Democratic Alliance. In 2012, he gave a speech entitled "Was Enoch [Powell] right about immigration?" to a seminar organised by Alan Harvey of the Springbok Club and a one time chairman of the Swinton Circle, with whom he had been in the National Party.

Elections contested

References

1930s births
Living people
English far-right politicians
National Front (UK) politicians
Conservative Party (UK) politicians